To Kwa Wan Road is a major thoroughfare in To Kwa Wan, Kowloon, Hong Kong, connecting To Kwa Wan with Ma Tau Kok.

See also 

 Grand Waterfront
 To Kwa Wan station
 13 Streets

Roads in Kowloon
To Kwa Wan